Brachyleptura fulva is a species of longhorn beetle in the  subfamily Lamiinae found in Crimea and France. The colour of the species is black, with orange wings.

References

Lepturinae
Beetles described in 1775
Taxa named by Charles De Geer
Beetles of Europe